Governor Beasley may refer to:

David Beasley (born 1957), 113th Governor of South Carolina
Jere Beasley (born 1935), Acting Governor of Alabama